Big Hawaii is an American drama television series that aired from September 21 until November 23, 1977. The pilot film Danger In Paradise aired on May 12, 1977 (the series was also screened on ITV in Britain under that title).

Premise
A wealthy family owns the massive Paradise Ranch on the island of Hawaii.

Cast
Cliff Potts as Mitch Fears
John Dehner as Barrett Fears
Lucia Stralser as Karen "Keke" Fears
Bill Lucking as Oscar Kalahani
Elizabeth Smith as Lulu (Auntie Lu)
Moe Keale as Garfield
Remi Abellira as Kimo
Josie Over as Asita

Episodes

References

External links

1977 American television series debuts
1977 American television series endings
1970s American drama television series
English-language television shows
NBC original programming
Television shows set in Hawaii
Television series about families
Television series by MGM Television
Television series by Filmways